Birch River is a local urban district in the northern portion of the Rural Municipality of Mountain, Manitoba, Canada. It is around 40 kilometers from Swan River, Manitoba.

Demographics 

Attractions
The 183 hectare Birch River Ecological Reserve is located within Porcupine Provincial Forest, just two kilometres north of the community of Birch River. Passive visits on foot are allowed without a permit. All other activities require prior approval.

Climate

References

Local urban districts in Manitoba
Designated places in Manitoba
Unincorporated communities in Parkland Region, Manitoba